Shake the Dust is the debut studio album by the rock band The Ettes. The album was released on September 12, 2006.

Track listing

2006 debut albums